Laurie Olin (born 1938, Marshfield, Wisconsin) is an American landscape architect. He has worked on landscape design projects at diverse scales, from private residential gardens to public parks and corporate/museum campus plans.

Early life
Olin grew up in Alaska, and earned his degree in Architecture from the University of Washington in Seattle, where he was mentored under Richard Haag.

Career
After graduating he worked for offices in Seattle, New York City, and London. In 1976 he became a professor for the University of Pennsylvania, where he offered courses on the design of environments. In 1986 he became head chair of the landscape architecture program at Harvard University. After serving as chair at Harvard, Olin returned to University of Pennsylvania where he continues to be Practice Professor of Landscape Architecture.

Founding OLIN
Olin is the founding partner of the landscape architecture and urban design firm OLIN, formerly Olin Partnership.  The firm received the Cooper-Hewitt National Design Award for Landscape Design in 2008, and in 2010 was on the winning team in the competition to design the new United States Embassy in London with architects KieranTimberlake.

Writing
Olin has written widely on the history and theory of architecture and landscape, receiving the Bradford Williams medal for best writing on Landscape Architecture. Olin co-authored La Foce: A Garden and Landscape in Tuscany, which includes a historical essay, along with photographs, sketches, and a critical analysis of the early 20th-century garden in Italy. Across the Open Field (2000), is both a memoir and series of essays on the evolution of the English landscape. He is also the author of Transforming the Commonplace (1996) and Vizcaya: An American Villa and Its Makers (2006, with Witold Rybczynski), on James Deering's mansion in Coconut Grove, Florida.

Awards and honors
Olin is a Guggenheim Fellow, an American Academy of Rome Fellow, a Fellow of the American Society of Landscape Architects (ASLA), an honorary member of the  American Institute of Architects (AIA), a Fellow of the American Academy of Arts and Sciences, the 1999 Wyck-Strickland Award recipient. Olin won the Rome Prize in Landscape Architecture in 1972, was the recipient of the 1998 Award in Architecture from the American Academy of Arts and Letters, and was recently inducted into the American Academy of Arts and Letters. Olin was a speaker in the Spotlight on Design Lecture Series at the National Building Museum in 2003. In 1994 he was elected into the National Academy of Design. In 2013 he was presented with the prestigious National Medal of Arts by President Obama. Awarded by the National Endowment for the Arts, it is the highest honor given to artists by the US Government.

Notable projects

Europe
 Bishopsgate, London, England
 Brancusi Ensemble, Târgu Jiu, Romania
 Memorial to the Murdered Jews of Europe, Berlin, Germany (with architect Peter Eisenman)
 Westferry Circus, London, England

United States
 Apple Park, Cupertino, California
 Director Park, Portland, Oregon
 1 Memorial Drive, campus of the headquarters of the Federal Reserve Bank of Kansas City
 ARCO corporate headquarters, La Palma, California
 Battery Park City, Manhattan, New York
 Bryant Park, Manhattan, New York
 Columbus Circle, Manhattan, New York
 Getty Center, Brentwood, Los Angeles, California
 Hudson Yards Redevelopment Project, Manhattan, New York
 Mill River Park & Greenway, Stamford, Connecticut
 Pacific Park, open space around development, Brooklyn, New York
 Pershing Square, Los Angeles, California
 Robert F. Wagner Park, New York
 University of Pennsylvania, Philadelphia, Pennsylvania (Campus Development Plan)
 Washington Monument, Washington, DC
 Toledo Museum of Art, Toledo, Ohio
 National Gallery of Art Sculpture Garden, Washington, DC
 LDS Conference Center roof ambient, part of The Gardens at Temple Square, Salt Lake City, Utah

Awards
 ASLA Merit Award, ARCO Research Center, 1984
 Progressive Architecture Magazine Design Award, Battery Park City, 1985
 Urban Landscape Institute Award for Excellence for Public Projects, Bryant Park, 1996
 ASLA Landmark Award, Battery Park City, 2003
 ASLA Design Honor Award, the J. Paul Getty Center, 2003
 ASLA Award of Excellence, The Heart of the Park at Hermann Park, 2005
 Mid-Atlantic Construction Magazine Park/Landscape Award of Merit, the Washington Monument, 2005
 AIA Honor Award for Regional and Urban Design, the University of British Columbia, 2006
 ASLA Landscape Architecture Firm Award (awarded to OLIN firm), 2006
 ASLA General Design Award of Honor, Columbus Circle, 2006
 Royal Architectural Institute of Canada Urban Design Award, the University of British Columbia, 2006
 ASLA General Design Award Of Honor, the Washington Monument, 2008
 Cooper-Hewitt National Design Award (awarded to OLIN firm), 2008
 Urban Land Institute Award of Excellence, Comcast Building (awarded to OLIN firm), 2009
 Building Institute's Bybee Prize, 2010
 ASLA Landmark Award, Bryant Park (awarded to OLIN firm), 2010
 ASLA Medal, 2011
 National Medal of Arts, 2012 
 Thomas Jefferson Medal in Architecture, 2013
 Vincent Scully Prize, 2017

Publications
France Sketchbooks, 2020. Edited by Laurie Olin and Pablo Mandel 
Be Seated, 2018. 
OLIN: Placemaking, 2008. 
 Vizcaya: An American Villa and its Members, with Witold Rybczynski, 2007. 
La Foce: A Garden and Landscape in Tuscany, with Benedetta Origo et al., 2001. 
Across the Open Field: Essays Drawn from English Landscapes, 2000. 
 Transforming the Common Place: Selections from Laurie Olin's Sketchbook, 1996.
 Breath on the Mirror: Seattle's Skid Road Community, 1973.

References

Dowdell, Jennifer. "Washington Monument, Security Built In: An Underground Center Nixed as Construction begins on Olin Partnership's Design" Landscape Architecture 2004.
Dvořák, Petula. "Washington Monument Subtly Fortified" Washington Post 2005.
Goodridge, Elisabeth. "Landscape Redesigned at Washington Monument" Deseret News 2 April 2006 A.02
Smith, Sandy. "Laurie Olin: Q and A" The Penn Current. December 13, 2001.
"Concept" Battery Park City Authority, viewed October 29, 2006.
"Getty Center" Getty Center Trust. 2003, viewed October 31, 2006.
OLIN viewed October 28, 2006.
The Cultural Landscape Foundation Online viewed November 1, 2006.

External links
Official OLIN design studio website

American landscape architects
1938 births
Living people
American landscape and garden designers
Architects from Alaska
Architects from Pennsylvania
Architects from Wisconsin
Members of the American Academy of Arts and Letters
United States National Medal of Arts recipients
Harvard University faculty
University of Pennsylvania faculty
People from Marshfield, Wisconsin
University of Washington College of Built Environments alumni
20th-century American architects
21st-century American architects